Oliver "Power" Grant is an American entrepreneur, producer, streetwear clothing mogul and actor. As a close associate of the hip-hop group, Wu-Tang Clan, Grant executive produced all of the Wu-Tang Clan albums. He is the original founder and CEO of the Wu Wear clothing line and stores.

Life and career

Wu-Tang Affiliation
Grant grew up in the Park Hill projects in Staten Island, New York with members of the Wu-Tang Clan. He was childhood friends with RZA's older brother Divine, and got in on the ground floor of the Clan's inception by making a sizable investment in the group's future. Over a game of chess, two of the Wu-Tang Clan founding members gave him the name "Power" because that is the amount of force it takes in order to do work. Grant is also an older brother of Wu-Tang's affiliate Killarmy member Killa Sin.

Wu Wear
Grant became successful as a clothing mogul in 1995 when he launched Wu Wear, often regarded as one of the first artist-inspired clothing lines. He began by selling clothes with the group's logo on it via mail order. Initially, manufacturers wouldn't extend Grant the credit, but after the group saw platinum success, he opened a Wu Wear store on Victory Boulevard in their hometown of Staten Island, and an office in Manhattan's garment district to sell wholesale. According to the Of Mics and Men documentary which debuted on Showtime in 2019, Power's business moves led to the opening of four stores across the country. The line was carried in Macy's, Rich's and the (now defunct) clothing store d.e.m.o., resulting in annual revenue topping out at upwards of $25 million during the group's peak years.  In 2008, Grant renamed it "Wu-Tang Brand" and discontinued the Wu Wear line which was being counterfeited and sold online.

Grant and the RZA joined forces with Live Nation Merchandise to relaunch the classic clothing line in 2017. Power serves as the brand's "Historic Creative Consultant" to ensure quality creative control. The line includes classic designs as well as new items.
In a 2013 interview, Power discussed the Wu's lasting legacy and the impact its brand made on the industry, crediting the Wu's clothing line and other successful side-ventures as early entrepreneurialism that laid the foundation and open doors for future generations of hip-hop artists to explore other business opportunities outside of music. "Nowadays, all the walls are broken [for Hip Hop artists]. That’s what we were fighting for…this culture would be that much...further if there was a lot less blocking going on and a lot less hating on going [by corporate America]."

Film and Television
Grant made his film debut as "Knowledge" in the urban cult classic Belly, directed by Hype Williams. In addition, he played the role of "Rich Bower" in writer/director James Toback’s Black and White, which also starred Ben Stiller, Robert Downey Jr., Brooke Shields, Elijah Wood, Mike Tyson, and several others. He was also a producer and music supervisor of the film. He would work again with Toback as actor and composer for When Will I Be Loved, starring Neve Campbell.  He also had the leading role and was a producer on the feature film Coalition. He has a co-starring role in talk show host and former nationally syndicated shock jock Wendy Williams’ life story Queen of Media as her husband Big Kev.

Wu-Tang: Shaolin Style
In 1999, Grant produced, developed and released Wu-Tang: Shaolin Style, a four-player 3D fighting video game for the PlayStation. The Wu-Tang Clan is the basis for the game's story and setting and features characters based on their stage personas and the martial arts themes of their music. Some members of the group also provided voiceover work for the game and made vocal and production contributions to the game's music.

Wu-Tang: An American Saga

In the Hulu exclusive Wu-Tang: An American Saga series, Power is portrayed by actor Marcus Callender, who watched as much footage of Power as he could find and wrote "It is a complete honor to be portraying one of the vital pieces of the Wu-Tang Clan" on his Instagram account.

Filmography

Films

References

External links
 VIBE: "Why You Should Know Him"
 TIME Magazine
 Entertainment Weekly
 Hip Hop in America
 NY Post
 The Power 30
 Strictly Fitteds
 TIME
 Salon
 Billboard
 SOHH article
 Wu-Tang management
 CD listing
 WhatsHeart

Living people
African-American businesspeople
American music industry executives
American male film actors
Wu-Tang Clan
Year of birth missing (living people)